Kielbasa (from Polish  ) is any type of meat sausage from Poland and a staple of Polish cuisine. In American English the word typically refers to a coarse, U-shaped smoked sausage of any kind of meat, which closely resembles the Wiejska sausage (typically pork only).

Etymology and usage
The word entered English directly from the Polish  and Czech klobása, meaning "sausage". Etymological sources state that originally, the word comes from Turkic kol basa, literally "hand-pressed", or kül basa, literally "ash-pressed" (cognate with modern Turkish dish ), or possibly from the Hebrew kol basar, literally meaning "all kinds of meat;" however, other origins are also possible.

The terms entered English simultaneously from different sources, which accounts for the different spellings. Usage varies between cultural groups and countries, but overall there is a distinction between American and Canadian usage. In New Jersey, Pennsylvania and most areas of Greater New York City, a plural Polish transitional form is used, . Canadians also use the word kolbassa or kubasa ( or ), an Anglicization of the Ukrainian kovbasa,  and Albertans even abbreviate it as kubie to refer to the sausage eaten on a hot dog bun.

Varieties and regional variations

Poland

Sausage is a staple of Polish cuisine and comes in dozens of varieties, smoked or fresh, made with pork, beef, turkey, lamb, chicken or veal with every region having its own speciality. Of these, the kiełbasa lisiecka, produced in Małopolskie, kiełbasa biała parzona wielkopolska and kiełbasa piaszczańska are Protected Geographical Indications in the EU and the UK. Furthermore, Kabanosy staropolskie, Kiełbasa jałowcowa staropolska, Kiełbasa krakowska sucha staropolska and Kiełbasa myśliwska staropolska are Traditional Specialities Guaranteed in the UK and EU as well.

There are official Polish government guides and classifications of sausages based on size, meat, ready-to-eat or uncooked varieties.

Originally made at home in rural areas, there are a wide variety of recipes for kielbasa preparation at home and for holidays. Kielbasa is also one of the most traditional foods served at Polish weddings. Popular varieties include:
 kabanos, a thin, air-dried sausage flavoured with caraway seed, originally made of pork, sometimes a horse meat variation may be found. 
 kiełbasa odesska, made with beef.
 kiełbasa wędzona, Polish smoked sausage, used often in soups.
 krakowska, a thick, straight sausage hot-smoked with pepper and garlic; its name comes from Kraków
 wiejska, farmhouse or countryside sausage; it is a large U-shaped pork and veal sausage with marjoram and garlic, sometimes also containing small amounts of coriander; its name means "rural" or (an adjectival use of) "country", or (adjectival use of) "village".
 weselna, "wedding" sausage, medium thick, u-shaped smoked sausage; often eaten during parties, but not exclusively.
 kaszanka, kiszka or krupniok is a traditional blood sausage or black pudding. An Upper Silesian version using breadcrumbs instead of groat is called żymlok from "żymła" - bread roll .
 myśliwska is a smoked, dried pork sausage, similar to kabanos but much thicker. 
  kiełbasa biała, a white sausage sold uncooked and often used in soups, probably of Bavarian or Thuringian origin.
 
The most popular kiełbasa is also called "Kiełbasa Polska" ("Polish Sausage") or "Kiełbasa Starowiejska" ("Old Countryside Sausage").

In Poland, kiełbasa is often served garnished with fried onions, and – in the form of cut pieces – smoked kiełbasa can be served cold, hot, boiled, baked or grilled. It can be cooked in soups such as żurek (sour rye soup), kapuśniak (cabbage soup), or grochówka (pea soup), baked or cooked with sauerkraut, or added to bean dishes and stews (notably bigos, a Polish national dish). Kiełbasa is also very popular served cold as cold cuts on a platter, usually for an appetizer at traditional Polish parties. It is also a common snack (zagrycha) served with beer or plain vodka.

A less widely encountered but equally popular variety of kiełbasa is the White Fresh (biała - i.e. "white"). It is mainly used as a soup meat, and is therefore sold uncooked and unsmoked. When used, it is prepared by boiling, frying or boiling in soup in place of raw meat. This kiełbasa's taste is similar to a white Thuringian sausage. Traditionally served with barszcz biały.

Ukraine
In Ukraine, "kielbasa" is called "kovbasa". It is a general term that refers to a variety of sausages, including "domashnia" (homemade kovbasa), "pechinky" (liver kovbasa), and "vudzhena" (smoked kovbasa).

It is served in a variety of ways such as fried with onions atop varenyky, sliced on rye bread, eaten with an egg and mustard sauce and lastly in "Yayeshnia z kovbasoyu i yarynoyu" a dish meaning fried sausage with bell pepper and scrambled eggs. In Ukraine kovbasa may be roasted in an oven on both sides and stored in ceramic pots with lard. The sausage is often made at home however has become increasingly brought at markets and even supermarkets. Kovbasa also tends to accompany "pysanka" (dyed and decorated eggs) as well as the Orthodox Easter bread, paska, in baskets which is blessed by the Ukrainian Orthodox priests with holy water before being consumed.

The most generic forms of Ukrainian kovbasa include garlic. Those in the Ukrainian SSR of the late Soviet Union who prioritised welfare and economic issues over the 'national question' (independence) were often referred to as having a 'kovbasa mentality'.

Hungary

Kolbász is the Hungarian word for sausage. Hungarian cuisine produces a vast number of types of sausages. The most common smoked Hungarian sausages are Gyulai Kolbász, Csabai Kolbász, Csemege Kolbász, Házi Kolbász, Cserkész Kolbász, lightly smoked, like Debreceni Kolbász (or Debreciner) and Lecsókolbász, a spicy sausage made specifically for serving as part of the dish Lecsó, a vegetable stew with peppers and tomatoes. Hungarian boiled sausage types are called "hurka": either liver sausage, "májas", or blood sausage, "véres". The main ingredient is liver and rice, or blood and rice. Salt, pepper, and spices are optionally added. Butter is not.

Slovenia
The kranjska klobasa "Carniolan sausage" closely resembling the Polish kiełbasa wiejska is the best known Slovenian sausage.

United States

In the United States, kielbasa which may also be referred to as Polish sausage in some areas, is widely available in grocery stores and speciality import markets. While the smoked variety is more commonly found, the uncured variety is often available, particularly in areas with large Polish populations. Several sandwiches featuring the sausage as a main ingredient have become iconic in local cuisines including Chicago's Maxwell Street Polish,  Cleveland's Polish Boy, and several offerings from Primanti Brothers in Pittsburgh.

Canada
In Canada, varieties typical of Poland, Hungary, Slovakia, Czech Republic, western Ukraine, and elsewhere are available in supermarkets, and more specific varieties can be found in specialty shops. The world's largest display model of a Ukrainian sausage is a roadside attraction in Mundare, Alberta, the home of Stawnichy's Meat Processing.

Elsewhere
In Russia, it is known as kolbasa (колбаса ), mentioned as early as the 12th century in Birch bark manuscript number 842. In the Russian language the word kolbasa refers to all sausage-like meat products including salami and bologna. Similar sausages are found in other countries as well, notably the Czech Republic (spelled "klobása", or regionally "klobás"), Slovakia (spelled "klobása"), and Slovenia (spelled "klobása"). In Croatia, as well as in Bosnia and Herzegovina, Montenegro, and Serbia, this sausage is called "kobasica" or "kobasa", while in Bulgaria and North Macedonia it is called "kolbas".) In Austria it is called "Klobassa" (similar to the neighbouring Slavic-speaking countries). In South Africa, this type of sausage is known as the "Russian" sausage, and is often deep-fried and served with chips as fast food.

In China, where once prominent White émigré residents fleeing from the Russian Civil War were concentrated, the food was gradually localized around major hubs. Even though Harbin Russian residents are scarce today, Kielbasa remains in production well into the 21st century in Harbin.

See also
Charcuterie
Salumi
Sucuk

Explanatory notes

References

External links

Polish Kielbasa (Polish Sausage)
Czech klobásy recipe 

Lunch meat
Cuisine of Manitoba
Cuisine of the Midwestern United States
Culture of Cleveland
Lithuanian cuisine
Polish cuisine
Polish products with protected designation of origin
Polish sausages
Polish-American culture in Chicago
Sausages
Slovak cuisine
Smoked meat
Ukrainian sausages